Duet Movies aka Prakash Raj Productions is an Indian film production and distribution company based in Chennai, Tamil Nadu, and owned by actor Prakash Raj. The company was established in 1999 with their first production venture being Anthapuram.

In 2001, Prakash Raj changed the company's name from Duet Cinema to Duet Movies for numerological reasons. It was changed as Silent Movies in Payanam and later changed as Prakash Raj Productions.

Filmography

References

Film distributors of India
Film production companies based in Chennai
1999 establishments in Tamil Nadu
Mass media companies established in 1999
Indian companies established in 1999